The X Factor Israel is the Israeli version of the British television music competition The X Factor. The second season started its run on Thursday, June 13, 2015. The show aired during prime time on Reshet network on Wednesdays and Saturdays. The season concluded on September 5, 2015.

Judges and hosts 
It was announced that Bar Refaeli, an Israeli fashion model, would host the second season. Contrary to most other versions of the X Factor where the judges panels was a mixture of singers and music industry figures, the Israeli version was composed entirely of musicians. The judges panel for the first season was composed of the rock singer Rami Fortis, the pop singer-songwriter and composer Moshe Peretz, the pop and R&B singer Shiri Maimon, and the pop singer Ivri Lider.

Contestants 
Key:
 – Winner
 – Runner-up
 – Third Place

Judges Houses

References

External links 
 

2015 Israeli television seasons
Israel